Drenča is a village in the municipality of Aleksandrovac, Serbia. The monastery of Drenča dates back to the Middle Ages. According to the 2002 census, the village has a population of  255 people.

References

Populated places in Rasina District